Jung Eui-Do (born 8 April 1987) is a South Korean footballer who most recently played as goalkeeper for Mokpo City FC in Korea National League.

Career
He joined Seongnam Ilhwa in 2009.

He moved to Suwon FC after finishing his military duties at Police FC.

References

External links 

1987 births
Living people
Association football goalkeepers
South Korean footballers
Seongnam FC players
Korean Police FC (Semi-professional) players
Suwon FC players
K League 1 players
K League 2 players
Yonsei University alumni